Thyretes negus is a moth in the  family Erebidae. It was described by Oberthür in 1878. It is found in Democratic Republic of Congo, Eritrea, Ethiopia, Guinea-Bissau, 
Kenya, Malawi, Namibia, Senegal, Sierra Leone and Togo.

References

Natural History Museum Lepidoptera generic names catalog

Moths described in 1878
Syntomini